Charles James Faulkner (1847–1929) was a U.S. Senator from West Virginia from 1887 to 1899. Senator Faulkner may also refer to:

Asa Faulkner (1802–1886), Tennessee State Senate
Charles J. Faulkner (1806–1884), Virginia State Senate
James H. Faulkner (1916–2008), Alabama State Senate
James Faulkner (Livingston County, New York) (1790–1884), New York State Senate